The Parish of Nattery is a parish of Argyle County located between Goulburn and Marulan in New South Wales. It is just east of the village of Towrang and includes the locality of Carrick. The Wollondilly River is the boundary in the north-west. Jerraba creek is part of the boundary in the south-east. The Southern Highlands railway line runs through the northern end of the parish, to the east of the Wollondilly river. The Hume Highway passes through the middle of the parish.

Portion 103 of the parish was granted to Joseph Peters, on which the Woolpack Inn was built and licensed on 17 June 1834.

References

New South Wales Parish maps preservation project

Parishes of Argyle County
Southern Tablelands